The Canadian province of Saskatchewan held municipal elections in its municipalities on October 28, 2009.

Listed are the results of selected municipal mayoral races in the province.

Estevan

Lloydminster

Melfort

Moose Jaw

North Battleford

Prince Albert

Regina

Saskatoon

Swift Current

Weyburn

Yorkton

Municipal elections in Saskatchewan
Saskatchewan municipal
2009 in Saskatchewan
October 2009 events in Canada